Mubuku is a settlement in Uganda.

Location
The coordinates of Lira are:0° 15' 41.00"N, 30° 7' 27.00"E (Latitude:0.261390; Longitude:30.124167).

Overview
Mubuku lies on the main Fort Portal-Kasese Highway, which continues on to Mpondwe at the International border with the Democratic Republic of the Congo. The town sits on the eastern bank of Mubuku River, the location of three hydropower electricity-generating plants; namely: Mubuku I Power Station, Mubuku II Power Station and Mubuku III Power Station. Due to its location, the town serves as a base camp for mountaineers who attempt climbing the Rwenzori Mountains. In the past, it also served as a training camp for the Ugandan national boxing team during preparations for international competitions.

Established in the 1960s, the scheme fell into disrepair during the 1980s and 1990s. The Government of Uganda has earmarked nearly 20 billion Uganda Shillings (US$8.2 million), to rehabilitate the project. The crops grown in the irrigated area include: rice, maize, millet, beans, sweet potatoes and groundnuts.

Population
The current population of Mubuku is not publicly known at this time.

See also
 Baamba
 Bakonjo
 Basongora
 Hima Cement Limited

References

External links
  Kasese District Webpage

Populated places in Western Region, Uganda
Cities in the Great Rift Valley
Kasese District